The American Magazine and Historical Chronicle (1743-1746) was a periodical in Boston, Massachusetts, printed by Rogers & Fowle (Gamaliel Rogers and Daniel Fowle), and published by Samuel Eliot and Joshua Blanchard. Scholars suggest that Jeremiah Gridley served as editor.

References

Further reading
 Albert Ten Eyck Gardner. A Majestick Shape: 1745. Metropolitan Museum of Art Bulletin, New Series, Vol. 8, No. 2 (Oct. 1949), pp. 74–80.
 James M. Farrell and Joseph M. Noone. Rhetoric, Eloquence, and Oratory in Eighteenth-Century American Periodicals: An Annotated Bibliography. Rhetoric Society Quarterly, Vol. 23, No. 2 (Spring, 1993), pp. 72–80.

External links

 http://nationalhumanitiescenter.org/pds/becomingamer/american/text5/text5read.htm

1743 establishments in Massachusetts
1746 disestablishments in Massachusetts
18th century in Boston
Magazines published in Boston
Magazines established in 1743
Magazines disestablished in 1746
Defunct magazines published in the United States